King Banaian (born September 29, 1958) is a Minnesota politician and former member of the Minnesota House of Representatives who represented District 15B from 2011 to 2013. The district includes parts of Benton, Sherburne and Stearns counties in the north-central part of the state. A Republican, he is an economist and an economics professor at St. Cloud State University in St. Cloud.

Banaian was first elected to the House in 2010, defeating DFL nominee Carol Lewis by just 13 votes after a recount. He served on the Capital Investment, the Higher Education Policy and Finance, the Rules and Legislative Administration, and the State Government Finance committees. In the 2012 election, Banaian was defeated by Democrat Zach Dorholt.

Named after his grandmother, Lena King Cloutman, Banaian attended Claremont Graduate University in Claremont, California, receiving his M.A. and his Ph.D. in economics. He was a community board member of the United Way of Central Minnesota.

References

External links 

 Rep. Banaian Web Page
 Project Votesmart - Rep. King Banaian Profile
 King Banaian Campaign Web Site
 King Banaian on Twitter
 King Banaian on Facebook

1958 births
Living people
Politicians from St. Cloud, Minnesota
Republican Party members of the Minnesota House of Representatives
Claremont Graduate University alumni
St. Cloud State University faculty
Economists from Minnesota
American people of Armenian descent
Saint Anselm College alumni
21st-century American politicians
20th-century American economists
21st-century American economists
Economists from California
Ethnic Armenian politicians